Chabab Atlas Khénifra is a Moroccan football club currently playing in the Botola. The club is located in the town of Khénifra. The club finished in the 2nd place in the Botola 2 in the 2013–14 season, which led to the promotion to the first division.

Football clubs in Morocco
1943 establishments in Morocco
Sports clubs in Morocco
Association football clubs established in 1943
Béni Mellal-Khénifra